The 1925 St. John's Redmen football team was an American football team that represented St. John's College of New York City during the 1925 college football season. Led by third-year head coach Ray Lynch, the team compiled a 3–4 record and outscored opponents by a total of 81 to 39.  The team played its home games at Ebbets Field in Brooklyn.

Schedule

References

St. John's
St. John's Red Storm football seasons
St. John's Redmen football